Peter Clarence Gerhardt  (November 26, 1877 – August 5, 1952) was a track and field athlete at the 200 meters.

Biography
He was born on November 26, 1877, in Virginia City, Nevada.

See also 
United States at the 1912 Summer Olympics

References

1877 births
1952 deaths
Olympic track and field athletes of the United States
Athletes (track and field) at the 1912 Summer Olympics
American male sprinters